Andrea Hlaváčková and Michaëlla Krajicek were the defending champions, but Hlaváčková chose not to participate. Krajicek competed with Caroline Garcia, but lost in the semifinals to Eva Birnerová and Anne Keothavong.

Eva Birnerová and Anne Keothavong won the title defeating Sandra Klemenschits and Tatjana Malek in the final 7–5, 6–1.

Seeds

Draw

Draw

References
 Main Draw

Aegon GB Pro-Series Barnstaple - Doubles